Peyton Stearns (born October 8, 2001) is an American tennis player.

Stearns has a career-high singles ranking by the WTA of No. 137, achieved on 6 February 2023, and a career-high WTA doubles ranking of No. 265, achieved on 30 January 2023.

Professional career
Stearns made her WTA Tour main-draw debut at the 2021 Silicon Valley Classic, where she received entry as an alternate into the doubles main draw. 

She made her Grand Slam debut as a wildcard at the 2022 US Open.

At the inaugural 2023 ATX Open in Austin, Texas, she earned her first WTA win as a wildcard over qualifier Brit Katie Boulter in a three-hour marathon. Next she defeated wildcard Mirjam Bjorklund to reach her first WTA quarterfinal.

College career
Stearns played college tennis at the University of Texas at Austin. Stearns became the first Texas player to win the NCAA Division I Women’s Singles National Championship.

Performance timelines 
Only main-draw results in WTA Tour, Grand Slam tournaments, Fed Cup/Billie Jean King Cup and Olympic Games are included in win–loss records.

Singles 
Current through the 2023 ATX Open.

Doubles 
Current through the 2022 US Open.

ITF Circuit finals

Singles: 8 (5 titles, 3 runner–ups)

Doubles: 3 (2 titles, 1 runner-up)

Notes

References

External links
 
 

2001 births
Living people
People from Mason, Ohio
American female tennis players
Texas Longhorns women's tennis players
Tennis people from Ohio
21st-century American women